Santa Sangre is a 1989 avant-garde surreal horror film directed by Alejandro Jodorowsky and written by Jodorowsky along with Claudio Argento and Roberto Leoni. It stars Axel Jodorowsky, Adán Jodorowsky, Teo Jodorowsky, Brontis Jodorowsky, Blanca Guerra, Thelma Tixou, and Guy Stockwell. An international co-production of Mexico and Italy, the film is set in Mexico, and tells the story of Fenix, a boy who grew up in a circus and his struggle with childhood trauma. It is signed on Empire magazine's 2008 list of the 500 Greatest Movies of All Time.

Plot
The film starts with a naked figure sitting in a tree in a mental asylum. Nurses come out to him, to try to coax him off of his perch, using a plate of raw fish to persuade him to come down. As the nurses get him to put on some overalls, it is shown that he has a tattoo of a phoenix on his chest.

Years ago, Fenix spends his time performing as a "child magician" in a circus run by his father Orgo, the knife-thrower, and his mother Concha, a trapeze artist and aerialist. The circus crew also includes, among others, a tattooed woman, who acts as the object of Orgo's knife-throwing feats, her adopted daughter Alma (a deaf mute mime and tightrope walker whom Fenix is close to), Fenix's dwarf friend Aladin, a pack of clowns and an elephant. Orgo carries on a very public flirtation with the tattooed woman, and their knife-throwing act is heavily sexualized.

Concha is also the leader of a religious cult that considers as its patron saint a girl who was raped and had her arms cut off by two brothers. Their church is about to be bulldozed at the behest of the landowner, and the followers make one last stand against the police and the bulldozers. A Roman Catholic Monsignor arrives to attempt to resolve the conflict, but after he enters the temple to inspect it he deems it sacrilege and angrily leaves in disgust, so the demolition is carried out. Fenix leads Concha back to the circus, where she discovers Orgo's affair, but Orgo, being also a hypnotist, puts Concha in a trance and rapes her.

The circus elephant dies, much to Fenix's grief, and a public funeral is conducted, in which the elephant is paraded through the city inside a giant casket. The casket is then dropped into the city dump, where scavengers open it up and proceed to carve up the elephant and take away the meat. Orgo chides Fenix for crying "like a little girl" and tattoos a spread-eagled phoenix onto his chest, identical to the one on his own chest, using a knife dipped in red ink. This tattoo, Orgo says, will make Fenix a man.

Later on, Concha, during her trapeze act, sees Orgo and the tattooed woman sneak out of the big top. She chases after them and, seeing them sexually engaged, pours a bottle of sulphuric acid onto Orgo's genitals. Orgo retaliates by cutting off both her arms (much like the girl previously venerated). He then walks into the street and slits his own throat. Fenix witnesses this, locked inside a trailer. He then sees the tattooed woman drive off with Alma.

Back in the present, Fenix is taken on a trip out of the asylum to a movie theater along with other patients, most of whom have Down syndrome. A pimp intercepts them and persuades them to take cocaine and follow him to meet an overweight prostitute. Fenix then spots the tattooed woman, who is now a prostitute, and becomes consumed with rage. Back in the asylum, Fenix's armless mother Concha calls out for him from the street and he escapes by climbing down a rope from his cell window. The tattooed woman is shown trying to prostitute Alma, who runs away and sleeps on the roof of a truck. The tattooed woman is then killed by the hands of an unseen assailant.

Fenix and Concha go on to perform an act whereby he stands behind her and moves his arms so that they appear to be Concha's arms. But Concha soon starts to use her son's hands to kill women whom Fenix is interested in, including a young performer and a cross-dressing wrestler. A dream sequence subsequently shows that Fenix has killed many more women, all of whom haunt him.

Alma finds Fenix and together they plan to run away from Concha. She tries to force Fenix to murder Alma as well, but, after a struggle, he manages to plunge a knife into Concha's stomach. She vanishes, but not before taunting Fenix by saying she will always be inside of him. Through a quick series of flashbacks, it is revealed that Concha in fact died after being maimed by Orgo, and that Fenix has kept a mannequin of his armless mother for performing on stage and at home, which also now appears in reality to be a thoroughly dilapidated house. He destroys the home-made temple and throws away the mannequin with the help of his imaginary childhood friends, Aladin and the clowns.

Alma proceeds to lead Fenix outside the house where police are waiting and order them to put up their hands. As they both comply, Fenix watches his own hands in awe as he does so. Fenix's realization that he has finally regained control of his hands brings him joy and peace.

Cast

Production

Development 
Roberto Leoni, who had worked in the library of a psychiatric hospital where he had been in contact with people suffering from mental disorders, developed a story about dissociative identity disorder that he told Claudio Argento during a time they worked together. Argento appreciated the story and added to it, and with Leoni, they decided to present it to the director who seemed to them the most suited to the material, Alejandro Jodorowsky. 
After his cult film The Holy Mountain of 1974, Jodorowsky was asked to direct a film version of Frank Herbert’s epic 1965 science fiction novel Dune but the project had collapsed, and except for the children’s fable Tusk in 1980 he had stopped directing films, working as a comics writer in France.

Jodorowsky developed this story, also telling Leoni the story of Gregorio Cárdenas Hernández, which were in some respects similar, and together they wrote the script of Santa Sangre.

Writing 

Roberto Leoni stated that an episode with a patient in the psychiatric hospital was probably the origin of Santa Sangre because over time he conceived "a story in which even the worst demon actually can't forget he is an angel." In fact, Fenix the character that Leoni created together with Jodorowsky is a serial killer, but "…every time he kills you feel sorry for him, that is you are sorry more for him than for the victim."

Release 
Though a Mexican and Italian co-production, Santa Sangre is in English.
In the United States, it was primarily rated NC-17 for "several scenes of extremely explicit violence". An edited version was released with an R rating for "bizarre, graphic violence and sensuality, and for drug content". Regardless, Santa Sangre did not receive a wide release in the U.S., only screening at a few theaters familiar with Jodorowsky's previous work.

In 2004 Anchor Bay released a DVD in the UK. On 25 January 2011, Severin Films gave the film a release on both DVD and Blu-ray with more than "five hours of exclusive extras". On Halloween 2019, Morbido Fest, a Mexico City-based festival, held a celebratory 30th anniversary screening of Santa Sangre remastered in 4K by Severin Films from a scan of the original camera negative. In Italy, from 25 to 27 November 2019, the Videa film society celebrated the 30th anniversary by screening the 4K restored version at select theatres.

Reception

Critical response
The film generally was critically well received, eventually being ranked 476th on Empire'''s 2008 list of the 500 greatest movies of all time.
A reviewer from the British Film 4 describing the film as "one of Jodorowsky's finest films" which "resonates with all the disturbing power of a clammy nightmare filtered through the hallucinatory lens of 1960s psychedelia."

Roger Ebert said that he believed it carried the moral message of genuinely opposing evil, rather than celebrating it like most contemporary horror films. Ebert described it as "a horror film, one of the greatest, and after waiting patiently through countless Dead Teenager Movies, I am reminded by Alejandro Jodorowsky that true psychic horror is possible on the screen – horror, poetry, surrealism, psychological pain, and wicked humor, all at once."

, the film had an 86% rating on review aggregator website Rotten Tomatoes based on 43 reviews, with a weighted average of 7.4/10. The site's consensus stated: "Those unfamiliar with Alejandro Jodorowsky's style may find it overwhelming, but Santa Sangre is a provocative psychedelic journey featuring the director's signature touches of violence, vulgarity, and an oddly personal moral center."

Accolades
The film was screened at the V Muestra de Cine Mexicano en Guadalajara where several groups of people left the room during the screening.Santa Sangre'' is considered a cult movie and the restored print of the film was screened in 2008 Cannes Classics

It was also screened during Locarno Film Festival 2016 Histoire(s) du cinéma: Pardo d'onore Swisscom Alejandro Jodorowsky

References

External links
 
 
 
 Santa Sangre on Mr Bongo

1989 films
1989 horror films
1980s horror thriller films
Mexican LGBT-related films
Mexican horror thriller films
Mexican avant-garde and experimental films
1980s English-language films
English-language Mexican films
English-language Italian films
Films about sideshow performers
1980s serial killer films
Transgender-related films
Italian serial killer films
Films about children
Fiction with unreliable narrators
Italian nonlinear narrative films
Films set in Mexico
Films shot in Mexico
Mexican independent films
Films directed by Alejandro Jodorowsky
Films scored by Simon Boswell
1980s Italian films
1980s Mexican films